Vallerotonda (locally ) is a town and comune (municipality) in the region of Lazio in central Italy, in the province of Frosinone. The commune is situated on the Apennine Mountains and forms part of the Comino Valley.

Geography
The area is historically tied to the Mezzogiorno, the Italian "South", only relatively recently in the 1920s Fascist rule, was it transferred to the "central" province of Lazio along with Latina from the Terra di Lavoro, which was a giustizierato (circumscription) of the former Kingdom of Naples.

It borders the communes Acquafondata, Cervaro, Filignano, Rocchetta a Volturno, San Biagio Saracinisco, Sant'Elia Fiumerapido, and Viticuso.

External links
Official website 
Website "la Ciociaria" 

Cities and towns in Lazio